Solar power in Nebraska is used for only a very small percentage of the state's electricity, although it is rapidly becoming competitive with grid electricity, due to the decrease in cost and the eight-year extension to the 30% tax credit, which can be used to install systems of any size. In 2015, the state ranked 47th among the 50 U.S. states with 1.1 MW of installed capacity.

Solar power and wind power could be harvested to provide all of Nebraska's energy need, although they would require either transmission lines to provide power when neither is available or storage. Estimates show that Nebraska could generate 3,832,600 GWh/year from wind, and 34.1% of demand from rooftop solar panels, using 8,200 MW of solar panels.

Utility installations 

Nebraska had seven utility-scale solar installations sized larger than 1.0 MW at the end of 2019.  These include a 5.8 MW system in Kearney and a 3.6 MW system in Lexington; both commissioned in 2017.  A 3.6 MW community solar plant on the west side of Lincoln was to be finished in 2016.

Other large solar installations include:
 A group of arrays totaling 108.9 kW at Creighton University.
 A 45 kW array at the Norfolk Operations Center of Nebraska Public Power District.

Statistics

See also
Wind power in Nebraska
Solar power in the United States
Renewable energy in the United States

External links
 Comparison of Solar Power Potential by State
 Nebraska solar cost estimate
 Renewable energy map
 Renewable energy policies and incentives

References

Energy in Nebraska
Nebraska